Admiral McDonald may refer to:

Art McDonald (admiral) (born 1967), Royal Canadian Navy admiral
David L. McDonald (1906–1997), U.S. Navy admiral
Wesley L. McDonald (1924–2009), U.S. Navy admiral

See also
Edward Orrick McDonnell (1891–1960), U.S. Navy vice admiral